The following highways are numbered 7B:

Canada
British Columbia Highway 7B

United States
 New York State Route 7B
 County Route 7B (Allegany County, New York)
 Oklahoma State Highway 7B
 Vermont Route 7B
 Secondary State Highway 7B (Washington)